The Gooding City of Rocks East Wilderness Study Area is a Bureau of Land Management wilderness study area that covers  in Gooding County, Idaho between the towns of Gooding and Fairfield. The Gooding City of Rocks East WSA is contiguous (but divided by dirt roads) with three other WSAs in the Bennett Hills: Black Canyon, Gooding City of Rocks West, and Little City of Rocks. Portions of the WSA's borders are formed by dirt roads, which also separates it from the Gooding City of Rocks West and Black Canyon WSAs.

There is a perennial stream in Dry Creek Canyon supports cutthroat trout on the western side of the WSA. Sagebrush and grasses are the dominant vegetation in the WSA, although willows, quaking aspen, and cottonwoods can be found in sections of some canyons. Wildlife that can be found in the WSA include elk, mule deer, coyote, and various birds of prey and upland game. Other streams, including Hot, Cottonwood, and Coyote creeks, flow through the WSA. However, the area will remain a WSA until it is released or designated a wilderness area.

References

Protected areas of Gooding County, Idaho
Protected areas established in 1992
Bureau of Land Management areas in Idaho
1992 establishments in the United States